Priscelia Chan Shih Mei, also known as Zeng Shimei, is a Singaporean television actress and host.

Career
Chan was a tax auditor before taking part in Star Search Singapore 1999. Despite being eliminated in the semifinals, she was offered a contract by TCS (later MediaCorp). She was initially cast in supporting roles in several Chinese-language television dramas produced by MediaCorp Channel 8, and made her debut as a lead actress in In Pursuit of Peace (2001) and Heartlanders III (2003). She acted in the mainland Chinese supernatural-fantasy television series The Legend and the Hero (2007). The series was aired on Channel 8 in 2009. She did not act in as many dramas in 2009 as she took several months off to finish her degree at SIM-RMIT.

Apart from acting, Chan has also performed songs for albums released by MediaCorp, with the latest being the MediaCorp 25th Anniversary Soundtrack Album. Chan also worked as a model for two television commercials for Fujifilm and Goldheart Jewellery in 2006 and 2007 respectively.

Chan was nominated as one of the Top 20 Most Popular Female Artistes in the Star Awards in 2003, 2004, 2006, 2007 and 2010.

Chan's performance as a villain in the 2013 mega-blockbuster The Voyage: A Journey was much lauded by industry professionals and audience members alike. This led to her clinching the coveted Rocket Award at the annual Star Awards, which is awarded to the MediaCorp artiste who has made the most breakthrough in the preceding year.

Personal life

Chan attended Bedok View Primary School and St. Hilda's Secondary School and obtained a diploma in accounting and finance from Temasek Polytechnic. She married fellow MediaCorp artiste Alan Tern, whom she first met while filming Springs of Life, on 6 October 2007. Since marrying, they have portrayed each other's spouse in Priceless Wonder and A Song to Remember.

Filmography

Compilation album

Awards and nominations

References

External links
 Priscelia Chan profile on The Celebrity Agency

Living people
Singaporean people of Hokkien descent
Singaporean women television presenters
Singaporean television actresses
Temasek Polytechnic alumni
1978 births